Argyrodes fissifrontellus is a species of tangle-web spider that is endemic to the Seychelles, and can be found on Mahé and Silhouette islands. It is found in woodland areas where it spins orb webs in vegetation, or is a keptoparasite in red-legged golden orb-web spider webs. It is threatened by habitat deterioration due to invasive plants, especially Cinnamomum verum.

References

Theridiidae
Endemic fauna of Seychelles
Vulnerable animals
Spiders of Africa
Spiders described in 1978